Egon Milder (22 April 1942 – 18 October 1975) was a German footballer. He spent four seasons in the Bundesliga with Borussia Mönchengladbach.

Career

Statistics

1 1964–65 includes the Regionalliga promotion playoffs.

References

External links
 

1942 births
1975 deaths
German footballers
VfL Bochum players
Borussia Mönchengladbach players
FC Luzern players
SC Kriens players
Bundesliga players
Association football midfielders